Rear Admiral Charles Cotterell (died 1754) was a Royal Navy officer who served as Commander-in-Chief, The Nore from 1744 to 1745.

Naval career
Cotterell became commanding officer of the sloop  in 1722. Promoted to captain in June 1726, he commanded, successively, the fifth-rate , the fourth-rate , the fifth-rate , the sixth-rate , the fifth-rate , the fourth-rate , the fourth-rate , the fourth-rate  and the fourth-rate . He saw action at the battle of Cartagena de Indias in May 1741. After that he commanded the first-rate  and served as Commander-in-Chief, The Nore from 1744 to 1745. He died in 1754.

References

1754 deaths
Royal Navy rear admirals